Wote may refer to:

People
 Aman Wote (born 1984), Ethiopian runner

Places
 Wote, Kenya

Other
 WOTE or Walk Off the Earth, Canadian band
 WOTE, American radio station

See also